Mads Hermansen (born 11 July 2000) is a Danish professional footballer who plays as a goalkeeper for Danish Superliga club Brøndby IF and the Denmark under-21 team.

Club career
Hermansen began his youth career at Næsby Boldklub, and transitioned into the goalkeeping role at age 10 where he suffered from achilles tendinitis.

In September 2015, Hermansen moved to Brøndby IF. He was promoted to the first team prior to the 2019–20 season.

On 5 November 2020, Hermansen made his professional debut in a Danish Cup match against Ledøje-Smørum Fodbold, which ended in a 1–0 win for Brøndby. At the end of the 2020–21 season, Brøndby became Danish champions for the first time since 2005, with Hermansen featuring as the backup to German goalkeeper Marvin Schwäbe. Therefore, he did not make a league appearance. 

After Schwäbe's departure to 1. FC Köln, Hermansen assumed to role as starting goalkeeper. He made his debut in the Danish Superliga on 18 July 2021 in a 1–1 draw against AGF. The following month, on 17 August, Hermansen made his European debut in a 1–2 loss to Red Bull Salzburg in the first leg of the play-off round of the UEFA Champions League. Despite the loss, Hermansen impressed in goal with vital saves.

On 3 December 2022, Hermansen received the award of Brøndby Player of the Year 2022 after putting in strong performances through the year.

International career
Hermansen has represented Denmark at youth international levels from under-16 to under-19.

In November 2020, Hermansen was called up for the Denmark under-21 team for the first time. On 7 September 2021, he gained his first cap for the team in a 1–0 win over Kazakhstan in the 2023 UEFA European Under-21 Championship qualification.

Career statistics

Honours
Brøndby
 Danish Superliga: 2020–21

Individual
 Brøndby Player of the Year: 2022

References

External links

2000 births
Living people
Danish men's footballers
Denmark youth international footballers
Denmark under-21 international footballers
Næsby Boldklub players
Brøndby IF players
Danish Superliga players
Association football goalkeepers
Footballers from Odense